Una Kang Naging Akin (International title: When You Were Mine / ) is a 2008 Philippine television drama romance series broadcast by GMA Network. Based on a 1991 Philippine film of the same title, the series is the tenth instalment of Sine Novela. Directed by Joel Lamangan, it stars Angelika Dela Cruz, Wendell Ramos, and Maxene Magalona. It premiered on September 1, 2008, on the network's Dramarama sa Hapon line up replacing Magdusa Ka. The series concluded on December 19, 2008, with a total of 80 episodes.

Premise
Tragedy strikes when the helicopter that Nick crashes on a remote island. A body is found in the crash site but it turned out to be Nick's officemate whose name was not listed in the passenger manifesto. The "death" of Nick caused great grief to Vanessa since she was already betrothed to be married to the young man. On the remote island, Nick meets Modesto Mallari, a marine biologist. Because of his memory loss, Nick introduces himself as Darwin. Mallari takes Darwin to his home where he introduces his daughter, Jessa. As time passes by, the two develop feelings for each other and have a child together. Darwin becomes involved in another accident that triggers the return of his past memories. With the return of his memory, Darwin's identity, as well as Jessa and their child, no longer exist in Nick's recollection.

Cast and characters

Lead cast
Angelika dela Cruz as Vanessa Yumul
Wendell Ramos as Nick Adriano / Darwin Salvador
Maxene Magalona as Jessa Mallari / Luisita

Supporting cast
Gina Alajar as Luisa Yumul
Alfred Vargas as Ronnie Bautista
LJ Reyes as Liway Mallari
Tony Mabesa as Don Jaime Adriano
Raquel Villavicencio as Doña Margarita Adriano
Ricardo Cepeda as Dr. Modesto Mallari
Maggie Wilson as Annie Villanueva
Mel Martinez as Eli Solis
Jim Pebangco as Tiyo Anding
Gillete Sandico as Tiya Agnes
Paolo Paraiso as Marvin
Paolo Serrano as Jule 
Mika Dela Cruz as Anna
Kevin Santos as Biboy
Frank Garcia as Raffy
Hazel Ann Mendoza as Violy

Ratings
According to AGB Nielsen Philippines' Mega Manila household television ratings, the pilot episode of Una Kang Naging Akin earned a 21.5% rating. While the final episode scored a 24.9% rating.

References

External links
 

2008 Philippine television series debuts
2008 Philippine television series endings
Filipino-language television shows
GMA Network drama series
Live action television shows based on films
Philippine romance television series
Television shows set in the Philippines